Storeria victa, the Florida brown snake, is a species of nonvenomous snake in the family Colubridae. It is endemic to Georgia and Florida in the United States.

References

Storeria
Snakes of North America
Reptiles of the United States
Snake, Florida Brown
Reptiles described in 1892
Taxa named by Oliver Perry Hay